Saint-Jean-sur-Richelieu is a city in eastern Montérégie in the Canadian province of Quebec, about  southeast of Montreal. It is situated on the west bank of the Richelieu River at the northernmost navigable point of Lake Champlain. As of December 2019, the population of Saint-Jean-sur-Richelieu was 98,036.

History
Historically, the city has been an important transportation hub. The first railway line in British North America connected it with La Prairie in 1836. It also hosts the annual International Balloon Festival of Saint-Jean-sur-Richelieu, a hot air balloon festival which attracts hundreds of tourists who come to see the hundreds of balloons in the sky each August.

The canal has one lock near the downtown core of Saint-Jean-sur-Richelieu. In the winter, the city builds a skating rink on the canal near the lock. In the summer, the embankment on the east side of the canal has a   cycling path.

The French built Fort Saint-Jean (Quebec) in the seventeenth century. Known to early English settlers as St. Johns, it provided an important communication link during the French and Indian Wars. During the American Revolutionary War control of the town changed hands several times as British and American forces moved through the area.

In 2001 the city and several adjoining communities were merged into the new regional county municipality with a population to 79,600. This merger was requested by the five municipalities involved and was not part of the municipal fusions imposed by the Quebec government the following year.

Geography
Saint-Jean-sur-Richelieu is located on the banks of the Richelieu River. The city is the seat of Le Haut-Richelieu regional county municipality and of the judicial district of Iberville.

Demographics 

The amalgamated municipalities (with 2001 population) were:
 Saint-Jean-sur-Richelieu (37,386)
 Saint-Luc (20,573)
 Iberville (9,424)
 Saint-Athanase (6,691)
 L'Acadie (5,526)

Despite the fact that nearby Montreal is very racially diverse, in 2021 Saint-Jean-sur-Richelieu had a very large majority of white residents (~94.4%). 4.1% of residents were visible minorities and 1.5% identified as Indigenous. The largest visible minority groups were Black (1.4%) and Latin American (0.8%).

French was the mother tongue of 92.5% of residents. Other common mother tongues were English (2.5%), Spanish (0.8%), and Arabic (0.5%). 1.4% claimed both French and English as first languages, while 0.4% listed both French and a non-official language.

68.9% of residents were Christian, down from 88.0% in 2011. 62.3% were Catholic, 4.3% were Christian n.o.s and 0.8% were Protestant. 29.3% of the population was non-religious or secular, up from 11.7% in 2011. All other religions and spiritual traditions accounted for 1.8% of the population. The largest non-Christian religion was Islam at 1.4%.

Neighbourhoods 
The city is divided in five sectors which refer to the former municipalities. Each sector contains different neighbourhoods:

Economy
Saint-Jean-sur-Richelieu is home to the Carrefour Richelieu regional shopping mall which has 115 stores.

Newer retail developments include Faubourg Saint-Jean, home to restaurants, services, stores, and a soon-to-open movie theatre.

The historic downtown area, which borders the Richelieu River and includes Richelieu and Champlain streets, is home to a variety of locally-owned bars, restaurants, and shops.

St-Jean is a manufacturing centre for textiles, wood products, sporting equipment, and metal transformation. It hosts an Area Support Unit (ASU) of the Canadian Forces, which functions as a primary recruit and officer training establishment.

Commuting patterns
The Ville de Saint-Jean-sur-Richelieu public transit system provides commuter and local bus services.

According to the 2016 Census, 22,840 residents, or 56.7% of the labour force work within the city. An additional 5,135 (12.7%) commute to Montreal, while 2,305 (5.7%) work in Longueuil, 1,440 (3.6%) work in Brossard, and 965 (2.4%) work in Chambly.

By contrast only 770 people commute from Montreal to work in Saint-Jean-sur-Richelieu every day, while 795 people commute from Longueuil, 780 commute from Chambly, 510 commute from Saint-Alexandre and 500 commute from Mont-Saint-Grégoire.

Transportation

The city is split in two by Autoroute de la Vallée-des-Forts (Autoroute 35) which goes North-South by going first through Saint-Luc district, then turns east just south of Pierre-Caisse Boulevard in Saint-Jean-sur-Richlieu district to cross the Richelieu River and to finally continue its way south through St-Athanase and Iberville districts. The highway continues south for some 24 km before ending at Saint-Sébastien.

Saint-Jean-sur-Richelieu has its own municipal airport, Saint-Jean Airport, and is also close to Montreal Pierre-Elliot Trudeau International Airport.

The former International Railway of Maine runs through the town, now the connecting point for the Central Maine and Quebec Railway with the Canadian Pacific Railway. The former Saint-Jean-d'Iberville railway station, which until 1966 served the Ambassador to Boston and New York City and the Washingtonian to Washington, D.C., is now a preserved building.

Education

The South Shore Protestant Regional School Board previously served the municipality.

In addition to more than a dozen public elementary and secondary schools, St-Jean is home to two private schools, one English-language school, and two higher education institutions:

 École Vision Saint-Jean, a trilingual (French-English-Spanish) primary school
 École Secondaire Marcellin Champagnat, a historically Catholic (now non-religious) high school
 Saint-John's School, the city's only English-language school, which serves students from Kindergarten through high school. Per Quebec law, only children whose parents attended English-language school are allowed to attend English school themselves; French is mandatory for everyone else. 
 Royal Military College Saint-Jean serves as a one-year preparatory program for the Royal Military College of Canada in Kingston, Ontario. Original founded in 1952, it ceased being a degree granting military college in 1995 due to cuts to military funding. RMCSJ continued to provide non-degree college programs for French-speaking cadets of the Canadian Forces. The Canadian federal government reopened the military college at Saint-Jean-sur-Richelieu in the fall of 2007 to provide the full first year of university, equivalent to the Kingston program, for students with English- or French-language backgrounds alongside the college program.
 CEGEP Saint-Jean-sur-Richelieu, part of Quebec's CEGEP network, offering post-secondary, pre-university programs

Notable people
Art Alexandre, professional ice hockey player, left wing for the Montreal Canadiens (NHL)
Edward Antill, American lieutenant colonel who participated in the 1775 Battle of Quebec and married a Quebecer, died here
Les Appendices, comedy group
Diane Boudreau, writer
Alexandre Boulerice, communication, adviser, community activist, journalist
Gerry Boulet, rock singer for the Offenbach band
Isabelle Brasseur, 1993 World Figure Skating Champion (Pairs), 1992/1994 Olympic bronze medalist
Éric Bruneau, actor
David Cadieux, Canadian champion heavyweight boxer
Capitaine Révolte, music group formed in Saint-Jean-sur-Richelieu in 1998
David Choinière, footballer for the Canadian Premier League side Forge FC
Stéphane Crête, actor
Jeff Deslauriers, professional ice hockey goaltender, former Anaheim Ducks (NHL)
Denis Gauthier, former professional ice hockey defenceman who played for the Calgary Flames, Phoenix Coyotes, Philadelphia Flyers and Los Angeles Kings (NHL)
Bernard "Boom Boom" Geoffrion, right wing hockey player, former Montreal Canadien (NHL), considered one of the innovators of the slapshot
Claude Giroux, wrestler
Hélène Harbec, Canadian journalist and poet
Israël Landry, teacher, musician, music merchant, editor in chief, consul
Rina Lasnier, GOQ, Canadian poet
Pierre Légaré, stand-up comic
Jean Lemieux, physician, novel and short-story writer
Antoine L'Estage, Canada's most successful rally driver, 10-time Canadian Rally Championship winner, North American Rally Cup winner and Rally X-Games participant
Didier Lucien, Quebec actor of Haitian origin
Félix-Gabriel Marchand, journalist, author, notary and 11th Premier of Quebec (1897–1900)
Joséphine Marchand-Dandurand, journalist, writer, and feminist activist
Claudine Mercier, comedian, singer, actress and impressionist
Jean-François Mercier, comedian, screenwriter and television host
Jean-Marc Parent, comedian
Danny Plourde, poet, novelist and professor
Jean-Francois Quintin, hockey player, left wing for the San Jose Sharks (NHL)
Claude Raymond was a major league pitcher and later a sports commentator.
Aurélie Rivard, para swimmer, including a multiple Paralympic medalist
Alain Rochat, Swiss footballer
Joey Scarpellino, actor
Ska/punk/reggae band Subb
Valérie Tétreault, tennis player
Pierre Tougas, watercolor painter
Marie Turgeon, actress
The Villeneuve family, racing drivers:
Gilles Villeneuve, Canadian racing driver, brother of Jacques-Joseph Villeneuve (born in Berthierville) and father of Jacques Villeneuve
Jacques Villeneuve, 1995 CART Champion, 1995 Indianapolis 500 Champion, and 1997 Formula One World Champion, NASCAR driver
Mike Ward, comedian
Kevin Owens, (real name Kevin Steen), World Wrestling Entertainment (WWE) Superstar

See also
 Le Haut-Richelieu Regional County Municipality
 Sainte-Thérèse Island
 Rivière des Iroquois
 Chambly Canal
 Richelieu River
 Champlain and St. Lawrence Railroad
 Royal Military College Saint-Jean
 L'Acadie (former municipality amalgamated into Saint-Jean-sur-Richelieu in 2001)
 List of cities in Quebec

References

External links

 Official website - www.ville.saint-jean-sur-richelieu.qc.ca

 
Cities and towns in Quebec
Incorporated places in Le Haut-Richelieu Regional County Municipality